The Sandalwood Fire was a wildfire that burned in the city of Calimesa in Riverside County, California. The fire started on October 10 in the afternoon, killed two people and destroyed 74 structures.

The fire, named after a street near where the fire started, ignited when a garbage truck dumped its smoldering load next to a canyon of dry scrub.

Events
Reported during a Santa Ana wind event that was anticipated for the area at around 1:58 pm Thursday, October 10, the Sandalwood fire broke out along Calimesa Boulevard and Sandalwood Drive immediately raced into nearby brush burning in a southwesterly direction due to the strong winds. Within the first hour of the fire, the conflagration was already heavily impacting the Villa Calimesa mobile home park where most of the damage from the fire would occur. Throughout the day, the fire would destroy most of the Villa Calimesa mobile home park and ultimately cause the death of two civilians in the area.

In all, 6 air tankers and 8 helicopters assisted in the firefighting operation.

References 

2019 California wildfires
October 2019 events in the United States
Wildfires in Riverside County, California